is an adventure game developed and published by Konami for the Nintendo Entertainment System. It is a sequel to a prior Goonies video game released on the Family Computer in Japan, which was only available in North America on Vs. System arcade units.

Gameplay
The Goonies II is considered an early example of a metroidvania game, with open level design similar to Metroid and Castlevania II. The game features two modes of play: platform and first-person. Most of the game is played as the former as the player works through a non-linear map. The player moves Mikey to new areas of the map by ladders or doors that may act as warp zones. Several different types of zones are found in the game, each with distinct enemies, graphics and music. The Fratelli family (Jake, Francis, Cousin Pipsqueak, and Ma Fratelli) will frequently appear to pursue Mikey; with the exception of Pipsqueak who vanishes when hit, they can be stunned briefly with attacks but cannot be defeated.

When the player exits the platform screen by entering a door, the game shifts to a first-person mode. Using a command menu similar to Shadowgate (released a few months after The Goonies II), the player explores the area by navigating through rooms, searching for hidden items and interacting with non-player characters. The items the player finds may be useful in the platform screens (such as weapons or transceivers) or within the rooms themselves (such as the candle, key and ladder). The player will find the six Goonies and eventually Annie in cells in this mode. Each rescued Goonie increases Mikey's health, and all six must be rescued before Annie can be freed.

There are a number of weapons the player can use, and the player can equip both a primary and secondary weapon. Mikey can use three primary weapons: the yo-yo, a short-range weapon with limited power; the slingshot, a ranged, ammunition-based weapon; and the boomerang, a slower ranged weapon with unlimited use. The bomb and molotov cocktail are the two secondary weapons the player can use, and the player can increase Mikey's carrying capacity by finding additional cases of them. These are explosive weapons that have a small blast radius and can damage Mikey if he is in range; the bomb can also reveal hidden doors. There are also two performance boosting shoes in the game; the spring shoes increase Mikey's jumping ability and are required to reach certain areas of the map, and the hyper shoes increase Mikey's speed and make some areas more easily accessible. The player must find and use a diving suit in order to reach underwater areas of the hideout; this item limits Mikey to using a harpoon gun and bombs as his weapons.

Various items found throughout the maze allow Mikey to reach different areas of the map include a ladder, a diving suit, and even glasses which can reveal hidden doors.

What the player has to do in order to obtain certain vital items is sometimes obscure. For example, the candle (an item necessary to finish the game) is obtained when Mikey hits a specific old woman five times in a row for no apparent reason.

An item called a Magic Locator Device can lead Mikey to a hidden Goonie, represented by a blue dot on the map.  Although Mikey can find and locate up to six Magic Locator Devices, when one Goonie is rescued all collected Magic Locator Devices will vanish, but they may be recollected if there are remaining Goonies.

Mikey loses one life whenever his health meter is completely drained or he falls off the bottom edge of the screen. When all lives are lost, the game is over and the player receive a password that can be used to resume play at a later time, retaining all items and progress to that point.

Annie the Mermaid

Annie was a character created specifically for the game, having never appeared in any other media prior to the game's release. She is portrayed with pink hair, pink scales and fair skin.  
In advertisements for the game in Japan, Annie was portrayed by a model in a pink tailfin who otherwise had dark hair.
Although Mikey can travel to Annie's cage once he has the correct items, without previously releasing all six Goonies her cage will not open.  Thus, the game cannot end unless all six Goonies are first rescued.
There is no Magic Locator Device anywhere in the game for assisting in finding Annie.

It is unknown why she was included as the final Goonie to be rescued.

Reception

The game received generally positive reviews upon release. Famitsu rated the game 26 out of 40. Computer and Video Games rated the game 81% in 1989.

It is listed as 16th on Gamasutra's list of 20 open world games. There, it is described as considerably less difficult than predecessor The Goonies though it still "basically requires a strategy guide to finish". Gameplay progression is based partially upon implicit clues, such as the strategic absence of things, making a player think that the occasional discovery is "the most awesome thing in the world".

References

External links

The Goonies II review at Retro Game Age

1987 video games
Nintendo Entertainment System games
Nintendo Entertainment System-only games
Konami games
The Goonies video games
Platform games
Metroidvania games
Video games developed in Japan